The Beattyville Grade School, located at 58 E. Center St. in Beattyville, Kentucky, was listed on the National Register of Historic Places in 2008.

It was built in 1940 according to the NRIS database, and in 1926 according to a housing rental website. It was converted into 18 apartments.

It originally served grades 1–12, then served grades 10-5 until 1969.

References

School buildings completed in 1940
National Register of Historic Places in Lee County, Kentucky
School buildings on the National Register of Historic Places in Kentucky
Apartment buildings in Kentucky
Beattyville, Kentucky
Education in Lee County, Kentucky
Public elementary schools in Kentucky
1940 establishments in Kentucky